The National Crisis Management Cell (reporting name: NCMC) was primarily a domestic intelligence assessment and management agency, operational under the Ministry of Interior (MoI), Government of Pakistan. The agency secondarily acted as a co-ordinating platform for all the other intelligence agencies in Pakistan.  Other activities of the cell involved building efforts towards counter-intelligence, counter-proliferation, counter-insurgency and counter-terrorism, as well as assisting the government, at all levels of command, in managing intelligence.

The National Crisis Management Cell was established in 2001 to tackle domestic and foreign terrorism, and to eliminate religious extremism in the country. Its influence and role in the intelligence community included issuing warnings and formulating efforts against all kinds of threats posed to the state. After a tragic incident at the Army Public School, the NCMC promoted efforts towards rigorous implementation of the National Action Plan (Pakistan).

After establishment of the National Counter Terrorism Authority, Pakistan, on March 2013, the National Crises Management Cell was annulled with effect from July 1, 2016.

List of director generals

2007–09: Brig(R) Javed Iqbal Cheema
2009–10: Wing Cmdr(R).  Tariq Ahmad Lodhi
2010–12: Brig(R) Javed Iqbal Lodhi
2012-12: Lt. Col(R) Umar Hayat Luk
2012–13: Brig(R) Javed Iqbal Lodhi
2013-13: Mr. Muhammad Ehsanullah Bajwa PSP
2013–14: Wing Cmdr(R).  Tariq Ahmad Lodhi
2014–16: Mr. Saud Aziz PSP

List of directors
 2006-2013 Mr. Farid Ahmad Khan, Joint Secretary

See also
 National Counter Terrorism Authority

References

Bibliography

External links
 Ministry of Interior

Law enforcement in Pakistan
2001 establishments in Pakistan
Pakistani intelligence agencies
Government agencies established in 2001
Pakistan federal departments and agencies